Brachystoma is a genus of flies belonging to the family Empididae.

Species
B. aestivus (Scopoli, 1763)
B. ambiguum (Philippi, 1865)
B. apicale Smith, 1969
B. bimaculatum Smith, 1969
B. flavella Wagner & Andersen, 1995
B. flavicolle Mik, 1887
B. fuscipennis Saigusa, 1963
B. jonesi Smith, 1969
B. longirostris (Macquart, 1823)
B. minuta (Olivier, 1791)
B. mite (Jones, 1940)
B. montanum Smith, 1969
B. nigrimanum Loew, 1862
B. obscuripes Loew, 1856
B. occidentale Melander, 1902
B. pectiniferum Smith, 1969
B. pleurale Frey, 1956
B. punctatus (Scopoli, 1763)
B. pusillus (Scopoli, 1763)
B. reflexiseta Smith, 1969
B. robertsonii Coquillett, 1895
B. serrulatum Loew, 1861
B. setosus (Scopoli, 1763)
B. simile Smith, 1969
B. spinulosa Loew, 1850
B. spinulosa Meunier, 1899
B. submaculatum Smith, 1969
B. takahashii Saigusa, 1963
B. thoracicum (Philippi, 1865)
B. truncatum Smith, 1969
B. vesiculosum (Fabricius, 1794)
B. vittigerum (Philippi, 1865)

Distribution
Species of this genus are present in Austria, Croatia, France, Germany, Italy, Republic of Macedonia, Poland, Romania, Slovakia and Switzerland.

References

External links
 Brachystoma at Biolib.cz
 Fauna europaea at faunaeur.org

Empididae
Empidoidea genera
Asilomorph flies of Europe
Taxa named by Johann Wilhelm Meigen